Annaly most commonly refers to:

 Annaly, a medieval lordship in central Ireland

Analy or Annaly may also refer to:
 Analy (singer), a Latin American singer (Ana Lilia Gerardo Lozoya)
 Analy High School, a public high school in Sebastopol, California
 Analy Township, a township in Sonoma County, California
 Annaly, U.S. Virgin Islands, a settlement in the U.S. Virgin Islands
 Annaly Capital Management, a real estate investment trust